Markéta Jirásková is a Czech mountain bike orienteer. She won a bronze medal in the middle distance at the 2007 World MTB Orienteering Championships in  Nove Mesto na Morave. She placed 8th in the long distance, and 14th in the sprint event.

References

Czech orienteers
Female orienteers
Czech female cyclists
Mountain bike orienteers
Living people
Year of birth missing (living people)